NMHA is an acronym for:

 National Mental Health Association (now known as Mental Health America)
 Navesink Maritime Heritage Association